This article shows the rosters of all participating teams at the 2017 FIVB Volleyball Women's U20 World Championship in México.

Pool A

The following is the Russian roster in the 2017 FIVB Volleyball Women's U20 World Championship.

Head coach: Vadim Pankov

The following is the Mexican roster in the 2017 FIVB Volleyball Women's U20 World Championship.

Head coach: Luis Alberto León Lopez

Pool B

The following is the Chinese roster in the 2017 FIVB Volleyball Women's U20 World Championship.

Head Coach: Shen Mang

The following is the Peruvian roster in the 2017 FIVB Volleyball Women's U20 World Championship.

Head Coach: Marco Queiroga

Pool C

The following is the Brazilian roster in the 2017 FIVB Volleyball Women's U20 World Championship.

Head coach: Cabral de Oliveira

The following is the American roster in the 2017 FIVB Volleyball Women's U20 World Championship.

Head coach: Laurie Corbelli

Pool D

The following is the Argentinean roster in the 2017 FIVB Volleyball Women's U20 World Championship.

Head Coach: Guillermo Caceres

The following is the Italian roster in the 2017 FIVB Volleyball Women's U20 World Championship.

Head Coach: Luca Cristofani

The following is the Turkish roster in the 2017 FIVB Volleyball Women's U20 World Championship.

Head Coach: Suphi Doganci

References

External links
 Official website

FIVB Volleyball Women's U20 World Championship
FIVB Women's U20 World Championship
FIVB Volleyball World Championship squads